The Autovía CV-80 or Autovía Sax-Castalla is a Spanish motorway, which connects the A-31 in Sax with the A-7 in Castalla. The autovía crosses two comarques: Alto Vinalopó and Alcoià.

CV-80
Transport in the Valencian Community